Members elected to the First House of Assembly of Vancouver Island which sat from August 12, 1856, to December 7, 1859. The election was two years before the first newspaper started so there is no known record of the actual vote totals.

Constituency
Victoria District
Edward Edwards Langford  – election contested and he was removed 26 August 1856 and replaced by Joseph William McKay on December 3, 1856
Joseph Despard Pemberton 
James Yates

Esquimalt District
John Sebastian Helmcken, Speaker
Thomas James Skinner 

Sooke District
John Muir, resigned 5 May 1857

Nanaimo District
Dr. John Frederick Kennedy

References

1856
History of Vancouver Island
Colony of Vancouver Island
1856 elections in North America
1856 in British Columbia